Miss USA 1996 was the 45th Miss USA pageant, held at South Padre Island Convention Centre on South Padre Island, Texas culminating in the final competition and crowning on February 2, 1996.

At the conclusion of the final competition, Ali Landry of Louisiana was crowned by outgoing titleholder Shanna Moakler of New York.

Landry is the first former Miss Teen USA state delegate to win the Miss USA title, the third Miss USA from Louisiana and the second Miss Louisiana USA to win both the Photogenic award and Miss USA crown, making Louisiana the only state to complete this feat after California did it in 1992. Landry is also the fifth and last Miss Photogenic to be crowned as Miss USA after winning the award.

The pageant was held on South Padre Island for the third and final time.  It was hosted by Bob Goen for the third time, and Maty Monfort offered colour commentary.  Aaron Neville provided entertainment during the competition.  

This was also the first year that the Miss Universe Organization opened a website dedicated to the pageant, and the first time they instituted an internet vote to choose the winner of the Miss Photogenic award.

It was also the first time since 1989 that there were 10 semifinalists, instead of the usual 12. Also, this was the first year since 1991 in which the delegates wore one-piece bathing suits for the preliminary and final swimsuit competitions.

Results

Placements

Special awards
Miss Congeniality - Ku'ualoha Taylor (Miss Hawaii USA)
Miss Photogenic - Ali Landry (Miss Louisiana USA)
Finesse Style Award - Becca Lee (Miss Tennessee USA)
Best in Swimsuit: - Danielle Boatwright (Miss Kansas USA)

Historical significance 
 Louisiana wins competition for the third time.
 Kansas earns the 1st runner-up position for the first time and reaches its highest placement since 1993.
 Tennessee earns the 2nd runner-up position for the third time. The last time it placed this was in 1984.
 Oklahoma finishes as Top 6 for the second time. The last time it placed this was in 1991.
 Michigan finishes as Top 6 for the first time and reaches its highest placement since Kenya Moore won in 1993.
 North Dakota finishes as Top 6 for the first time and reaches its highest placement since 1983.
 States that placed in semifinals the previous year were Illinois, Louisiana, Oklahoma and Texas.
 Texas placed for the fifth consecutive year.
 Illinois and Louisiana placed for the third consecutive year. 
 Oklahoma made its second consecutive placement. 
 Kansas and Tennessee last placed in 1994.
 Michigan last placed in 1993.
 North Dakota last placed in 1983.
 Utah last placed in 1982.
 Indiana last placed in 1981.
 Minnesota and Missouri break an ongoing streak of placements since 1994.
 New York breaks an ongoing streak of placements since 1993.

Scores

Preliminary scores
The following is the contestants average scores in the preliminary competition.

 Winner
 First runner-up
 Second runner-up 
 Top 6 Finalist 
 Top 10 Semifinalist

Semifinal scores

 Winner
 First runner-up
 Second runner-up 
 Top 6 Finalist

Delegates
The Miss USA 1996 delegates were:

 Alabama – Benita Brooks
 Alaska – Janelle Lynn Canady
 Arizona – Christina Novak
 Arkansas – Tiffany Parks
 California – Shauna Lyn Searles
 Colorado – Suesan Rajebi
 Connecticut – Wanda Gonzales
 Delaware – Star Behl
 District of Columbia – La Chanda Jenkins
 Florida – Idalmis Vidal
 Georgia – Jenny Craig
 Hawaii – Ku'ualoha Taylor
 Idaho – Tracy Yarbrough
 Illinois – Bernadette Przybycien
 Indiana – Holly Roehl
 Iowa – Jill Simon
 Kansas – Danielle Boatwright
 Kentucky – Lorie West
 Louisiana – Ali Landry
 Maine – Julann Vadnais
 Maryland – Michele Michael
 Massachusetts – Jacquelyn Doucette
 Michigan – Natasha Bell
 Minnesota – Karin Smith
 Mississippi – Caroline Ramagos
 Missouri – Aimee Rinehart
 Montana – Tanya Pogatchnik
 Nebraska – Kerry Lynn Kemper
 Nevada – Alisa Castillo
 New Hampshire – Julie Minta Gleneck
 New Jersey – Christina Augustyn
 New Mexico – Layla Linn
 New York – Keelin Curnuck
 North Carolina – Jessica Lee McMinn
 North Dakota – Juliette Spier
 Ohio – Melissa Boyd
 Oklahoma – Heather Crickard
 Oregon – Jill Chartier
 Pennsylvania – Susan Barnett
 Rhode Island – Karen Bradley
 South Carolina – Lysa Jackson
 South Dakota – Caresa Winters
 Tennessee – Becca Lee
 Texas – Kara Williams
 Utah – Tracy Kennick
 Vermont – Nancy Anne Roberts
 Virginia – Danielle Connors
 Washington – Staci Baldwin
 West Virginia – Regina Fisher
 Wisconsin – Mary Jo Stoker
 Wyoming – Kellee Kattleman

Crossovers
Ten delegates had previously competed in either the Miss Teen USA or Miss America pageants.

Delegates who had previously held a Miss Teen USA state title were:
Tracy Kennick (Utah) - Miss Utah Teen USA 1989 
Ali Landry (Louisiana) - Miss Louisiana Teen USA 1990 (Semi-finalist at Miss Teen USA 1990)
Holly Roehl (Indiana) - Miss Georgia Teen USA 1990 (Second runner-up at Miss Teen USA 1990)
Susan Barnett (Pennsylvania) - Miss Pennsylvania Teen USA 1990 (Finalist at Miss Teen USA 1990)
Kara Williams (Texas) - Miss Texas Teen USA 1991  (Semi-finalist at Miss Teen USA 1991)
Juliette Spier (North Dakota) - Miss North Dakota Teen USA 1992
Danielle Boatwright (Kansas) - Miss Kansas Teen USA 1992 (Second runner-up at Miss Teen USA 1992)
Jill Chartier (Oregon) - Miss Oregon Teen USA 1993 (Semi-finalist at Miss Teen USA 1993)
Tiffany Parks (Arkansas) - Miss Arkansas Teen USA 1993

Delegate who had previously held a Miss America state title:
Tracy Yarbrough (Idaho) - Miss Idaho 1994

Delegate who previously held a Miss USA state title:
Shauna Searles (California) took over the title of Miss California USA 1992 after Shannon Marketic was crowned Miss USA 1992.

Judges
C.C.H. Pounder
Patrick Warburton
Debbie Fields
Frankie Liles
Donna Sheen
Ricky Martin
Jeff Feringa
Matt Whiteside
Irene Bedard
Eddie Rabbitt

See also
Miss Universe 1996
Miss Teen USA 1996

References

External links
Miss USA official website

1996
1996 in Texas
1996 beauty pageants
Cameron County, Texas
February 1996 events in the United States